The 1958 South Dakota gubernatorial election was held on November 4, 1958.

Incumbent Republican Governor Joe Foss was term-limited.

Democratic nominee Ralph Herseth defeated Republican nominee Phil Saunders with 51.40% of the vote.

Primary elections
Primary elections were held on June 3, 1958.

Democratic primary

Candidates
Ralph Herseth, State Senator

Results

Republican primary

Candidates
Phil Saunders, incumbent Attorney General of South Dakota
L. Roy Houck, incumbent Lieutenant Governor
Charles Lacey, state representative

Results

General election

Candidates
Ralph Herseth, Democratic
Phil Saunders, Republican

Results

References

Bibliography
 

1958
South Dakota
Gubernatorial
South Dakota gubernatorial election